Zabransky is a surname. Notable people with the surname include:

Adolf Zábranský (1909-1981), Czech painter
David Zábranský (born 1977), Czech writer
Jared Zabransky (born 1983), American football player
Libor Zábranský (born 1973), Czech ice hockey player
 Tomáš Zábranský (1969-2021), Czech doctor and addiction expert